The Pennsylvania Treasurer election of 2020  took place on November 3, 2020. Primary elections were originally due to take place on April 28, 2020. However, following concerns regarding the coronavirus pandemic the primaries were delayed until June 2, 2020. Incumbent Democratic State Treasurer Joe Torsella was running for a second term against Republican Stacy Garrity.

On November 10, 2020, a week following election day, Torsella conceded to Garrity as she led him with 48.9% of the vote. Garrity's victory was an upset, with Torsella having a sizable fundraising advantage and consistently leading in polling throughout the campaign.

Democratic primary

Candidates

Declared
Joe Torsella, incumbent Pennsylvania Treasurer

Results

Republican primary

Candidates

Declared
Stacy Garrity, businesswoman and U.S. military veteran

Results

General election

Endorsements

Polling

Results

See also
 2020 Pennsylvania elections
 Elections in Pennsylvania

Notes

References

2020 Pennsylvania elections
State treasurers of Pennsylvania
Pennsylvania